The Speed Graphic was a press camera produced by Graflex in Rochester, New York. Although the first Speed Graphic cameras were produced in 1912, production of later versions continued until 1973; with the most significant improvements occurring in 1947 with the introduction of the Pacemaker Speed Graphic (and Pacemaker Crown Graphic, which was  lighter and lacked the focal plane shutter).

Description
Despite the common appellation of Speed Graphic, various Graphic models were produced between 1912 and 1973. The authentic Speed Graphic has a focal plane shutter that the Crown Graphic and Century Graphic models lack. The eponymous name "speed" came from the maximum speed of 1/1000 sec. that could be achieved with the focal plane shutter. The Speed Graphic was available in 2¼ x 3¼ inch, 3¼ x 4¼ inch, 5 x 7 inch and the most common format 4 x 5 inch. Because of the focal plane shutter, the Speed Graphic can also use lenses that do not have shutters (known as barrel lenses).

The Speed Graphic was a slow camera. Setting the focal plane shutter speed required selecting both a slit width and a spring tension. Each exposure required the photographer to change the film holder, open the lens shutter, cock the focal plane shutter, remove the dark slide from the inserted film holder, focus the camera,  and release the focal plane shutter. Conversely, if the lens shutter were used, the focal plane shutter (on the Speed Graphic and Pacemaker Graphic models with both shutters) had to be opened prior to cocking using the "T" or TIME setting, and then releasing the shutter in the lens. If indoors, the photographer also had to change the flashbulb. Each film holder contained one or two pieces of sheet film, which the photographer had to load in complete darkness. Faster shooting could be achieved with the Grafmatic film holder—a six sheet film "changer" that holds each sheet in a septum.  Even faster exposures could be taken if the photographer was shooting film packs of 12 exposures, or later 16 exposures (discontinued in the late 1970s). With film packs one could shoot as fast as one could pull the tab and cock the shutter, and film packs could be loaded in daylight.  A roll film adapter that used 120 or 220 film was available for 2.25 x 3.25, 3.25 x 4.25 and 4 x 5 inch cameras that permitted 8 to 20 exposures per roll, depending on the model of the adapter. Photographers had to be conservative and anticipate when the action was about to take place to take the right picture. The cry, "Just one more!" if a shot was missed was common. President Harry Truman introduced the White House photographers as the "Just One More Club."

Operation of the focal plane shutter
The focal plane shutter consists of a rubberized flexible curtain with slits of varying widths that cross the film plane at speeds determined by the tension setting of the spring mechanism. There are 4 slits with widths of 1/8 in, 3/8 in, 3/4 in, 1 1/2 in and “T” (T = “time” setting, used when lens diaphragm shutter is used to control exposure duration. The focal plane shutter is left completely open until manually released. The opening covers the entire area of the film for the size of the camera.)  On Speed Graphic models, there are 6 tension settings, adjusted by a butterfly winding knob that increases the speed that the slit crosses the film plane. On Pacemaker Graphic models, there are only 2 settings (high and low). The combination of the slit width and the spring tension allows for exposure speeds varying from 1/10 to 1/1000 sec.

Famous users
Perhaps the most famous Speed Graphic user was New York City press photographer Arthur "Weegee" Fellig, who covered the city in the 1930s and 1940s.

Barbara Morgan used a Speed Graphic to photograph Martha Graham's choreography.

Recent auctions show Irving Klaw used one in his studio for his iconic pin up & bondage photos of models such as Bettie Page.

In the 1950s and 1960s, the iconic photo-journalists of the Washington Post and the former Washington Evening Star shot on Speed Graphics exclusively. Some of the most famous photographs of this era were taken on the device by the twin brothers, Frank P. Hoy (for the Post) and Tom Hoy (for the Star).

The 1942-1953 Pulitzer Prizes for photography were taken with Speed Graphic cameras, including AP photographer Joe Rosenthal's image of Marines raising the American flag on Iwo Jima in 1945.  A few winning photographs after 1954 were taken with Rolleiflex or Kodak cameras. 1961 was the last Pulitzer Prize-winning photograph with a Speed Graphic, which taken by Yasushi Nagao showing Otoya Yamaguchi assassinating Inejiro Asanuma on stage.

In 2004, American photojournalist David Burnett used his 4x5 inch Speed Graphic with a 178 mm f/2.5 Aero Ektar lens removed from a K-21 aerial camera to cover John Kerry's presidential campaign.
Burnett also used a 4x5 inch Speed Graphic to shoot images at the Winter and Summer Olympics.

Graflex manufacturing history
The company name changed several times over the years as it was acquired and later spun off by the Eastman Kodak Company, finally becoming a division of the Singer Corporation and then dissolved in 1973. The award-winning Graflex plant in Pittsford, New York is still standing and is home to Veramark Technologies, Inc., formerly known as the MOSCOM Corporation.

Graflex model history

Post 1940 Graphic style cameras may be considered usable cameras,
rather than antique or collectible cameras. The Speed Graphic was
manufactured in a number of sizes, 4x5" being the most common, but
also in 2.25x3.25", 3.25x4.25" and 5x7".

Notes

See also
 Graflex
 Press camera

References

External links

 www.Graflex.org: Dedicated to promoting the use and preservation of Graflex Speed Graphics and other classic and large-format cameras
 MasterSite for the Larger Camera
 Graphic/Graflex FAQ on LargeFormatPhotography.com
 The Speed Graphic and the Aldis lens
 The Graflex Speed Graphic FAQ on Graflex.org
 'Unknown Weegee,' on Photographer Who Made the Night Noir
Weegee's World: Life, Death and the Human Drama
  Weegee Photographs
  More Weegee Photographs
 Enter the world of Graflex
 The Speed Graphic and your personal lens

Cameras